Gebisa Ejeta (born 1950) is an Ethiopian American plant breeder, geneticist and Professor at Purdue University. In 2009, he won the World Food Prize for his major contributions in the production of sorghum.

Early years 
Ejeta was born in the remote village Wollonkomi, Oromia to Oromo parents. Encouraged by his mother, he walked 20 kilometres to the nearest elementary school every Sunday evening and spend the week there.

During primary school, Ejeta planned to study engineering when he reached college age. However, his mother convinced him he could do more working in agriculture. With assistance from the Oklahoma State University, he attended an agricultural and technical secondary school in Ethiopia, and also studied at what is now Haramaya University. The university and the U.S. Agency for International Development helped him earn a doctorate from Purdue University.

Working in Sudan during the early 1980s, Ejeta developed Africa's first commercial hybrid variety of sorghum tolerant to drought. Later, with a Purdue University colleague in Indiana, he discovered the chemical basis of the relationship between the deadly parasitic weed striga and sorghum, and was able to produce sorghum varieties resistant to both drought and striga.

On 2011 President Barack Obama appointed Gebisa Ejeta as Member, Board for International Food and Agricultural Development.

Publications
Saballos, A., G. Ejeta, E. Sanchez, C. Kang, and W. Vermerris. 2009. A genome-wide analysis of the cinnamyl alcohol dehydrogenase family in sorghum (Sorghum bicolor (L.) Moench) identifies SbCAD2 as the brown midrib6 gene. Genetics 181:783-795.

Vogler, R., T. Tesso, K. Johnson, and G. Ejeta. 2009. Effect of allelic variation on forage quality of brown midrib sorghum mutants. African J. of Biochem. 3(3):70-76.

Peters, P., M. Jenks, P. Rich, J, Axtell, and G. Ejeta. 2009.  Mutagenesis, selection, and allelic analysis of epicuticular wax mutants in sorghum. Crop Sci. 49:1249-1258.

Saballos, A., W. Vermerris, L. Rivera, and G. Ejeta. 2009. Allelic association, chemical characterization and saccharification properties of brown midrib mutants of sorghum (S. bicolor (L.) Moench). Bioenerg. Res. 1:193-204.

Rich, P. J. and G. Ejeta. 2008. Towards effective resistance to Striga in African maize. Plant Signaling & Behavior 3:9, 618-621.

Amusan, I. O., P. J. Rich, A. Menkir, T. Housley, and G. Ejeta. 2008. Resistance to Striga hermonthica in a maize inbred line derived from Zea diploperennis. New Phytologist  178:157-166.

Knoll, J. E. and G. Ejeta. 2008. Marker-assisted selection for early season cold tolerance in sorghum:  QTL validation across populations and environments. Theor. Appl. Genet.116:541-553.

References

External links
Ethiopian American Wins 2009 World Food Prize Gebisa Ejeta developed drought-tolerant, parasite-resistant sorghum
Dr. Gebisa Ejeta - Purdue University Department of Agronomy
 Purdue plant breeder, geneticist receives 2009 World Food Prize
Sorghum researcher wins World Food Prize

1950 births
Living people
Ethiopian academics
Ethiopian scientists
Fellows of the African Academy of Sciences
Ethiopian emigrants to the United States
Purdue University faculty
American food scientists
American geneticists
Sorghum
Oromo people
People from Oromia Region
Agriculture and food award winners